Erin's Own GAA is a Gaelic Athletic Association club based in Waterford City, Ireland. The club enters teams in both GAA codes each year, which includes two adult hurling teams and two adult Gaelic football team in the Waterford County Championships.

The club has won the County Senior Hurling Championship a total of 13 times making it the second most successful club in the county.  The club has also achieved 8 championships in a row between 1927 and 1935.

The current president is Billy Kelly. This is a lifelong position within the club once appointed.

It is the oldest club in Waterford City and is third on the Waterford Senior Hurling Championship roll of honour (13 - including one 9 in-a-row).

Underage
For underage competitions up to Under-16, the club is known as Sacred Heart. Matches conducted by Sacred Heart are held in a community pitch in Killure, St. John's park. Both boys and girls begin to train from the age of four and compete at under 8's, under 10's, under 12's, under 14's and under 16's. Once the player in not eligible to play under 16's they fall into the category of Minor Hurling/Football and so come under the Erins Own designation.

Honours
 Waterford Senior Hurling Championships: 13
 1927, 1928, 1929, 1930, 1931, 1932, 1933, 1934, 1935, 1942, 1946, 1947, and 1962
 Waterford Intermediate Hurling Championships: 2
 1994, 1997
 Waterford Under 21 Hurling Championships: 2
 1968, 1974
 Waterford Minor Hurling Championships: 5
 1968, 1974, 1982, 2010, 2013
 Waterford Junior Hurling Championships: 2
 1929, 1931
 Waterford Intermediate Football Championships: 1
 1964
 Waterford Junior Football Championships: 1
 1930

References

Gaelic games clubs in County Waterford
Hurling clubs in County Waterford
Gaelic football clubs in County Waterford